The 86th Street station (also known as Gravesend–86th Street station) is a local station on the BMT Sea Beach Line of the New York City Subway, located at the intersection of 86th Street and West Seventh Street in Gravesend, Brooklyn. It is served by the N train at all times. During rush hours, several W and northbound Q trains also serve the station, serving as the southern terminus for W trips to Brooklyn.

History 
The station opened on June 22, 1915, as part of an expanded Brooklyn Rapid Transit Company operation to Coney Island–Stillwell Avenue. Between 2001 and 2005, the station was known as Gravesend–86th Street when N trains originated/terminated here while the Coney Island–Stillwell Avenue terminal was reconstructed. Some destination signage continues to use this name.

From January 18, 2016 to May 22, 2017, the Manhattan-bound platform at this station was closed for renovations. The Coney Island-bound platform was closed for a much longer period of time, from July 31, 2017 to October 29, 2018.

Between October 21, 2019 and Spring 2020, N trains terminated here so work could be completed to protect Coney Island Yard from flooding. An out-of-system transfer was available between the N at 86th Street and the F at Avenue X station.

Station layout

The station has four tracks and two side platforms. The two center express tracks are not normally used, but both are available for rerouted trains. To the south of the station, the four tracks merge into two tracks and there is a connection to the Coney Island Complex. , the Manhattan and Coney Island express tracks have been replaced with new track beds and new third rail protection boards.

There is a building on the Coney Island-bound platform for non-public uses. Like many other stations on the Sea Beach Line, the platforms are dilapidated and have paint-chipped columns. At the southern end of the station there is a pedestrian bridge for employees only that provides access to Coney Island Yard. South of the station the line exits the open cut and runs at-grade. Portions of the platform are located beneath 86th Street.

The 2018 artwork at this station is "Celebration", a glass mosaic made by Karen Margolis. The artwork highlights the connection between the neighborhood and commuters.

Exits
The only entrance to the station is through a station house at 86th Street between West 8th and West 7th Streets, and it has a crossover between platforms. There is an employee-only crossover between the platforms on the south end of the station; it is unknown if this crossover was part of a former second entrance, as the bridge also leads to a path to the nearby Coney Island Yard, although other stations on the line have two entrances.

Notes

References

External links 

 
 Station Reporter — N Train
 The Subway Nut — 86th Street Pictures 
 86th Street entrance from Google Maps Street View
 Platforms from Google Maps Street View (During 2016-2018 Rebuild)
 Southern end of the platforms from Google Maps Street View

BMT Sea Beach Line stations
New York City Subway stations in Brooklyn
Railway stations in the United States opened in 1915
1915 establishments in New York City